Zuénoula Department is a department of Marahoué Region in Sassandra-Marahoué District, Ivory Coast. In 2021, its population was 184,882 and its seat is the settlement of Zuénoula. The sub-prefectures of the department are Gohitafla, Iriéfla, Kanzra, Maminigui, Vouéboufla, Zanzra, and Zuénoula.

History
Zuénoula Department was created in 1980 as first-level subdivision via a split-off from Bouaflé Department. In 1997, regions were introduced as new first-level subdivisions of Ivory Coast; as a result, all departments were converted into second-level subdivisions. Zuénoula Department was included in Marahoué Region.

In 2011, districts were introduced as new first-level subdivisions of Ivory Coast. At the same time, regions were reorganised and became second-level subdivisions and all departments were converted into third-level subdivisions. At this time, Zuénoula Department remained part of the retained Marahoué Region in the new Sassandra-Marahoué District.

Notes

Departments of Marahoué
1980 establishments in Ivory Coast
States and territories established in 1980